The 2013 Pacific Life Pac-12 Conference men's basketball tournament was played March 13–16 at the MGM Grand Garden Arena in Paradise, Nevada. The UCLA Bruins, regular season champions, were named as the No. 1 seed team. Oregon won the tournament and received an automatic bid to the 2013 NCAA tournament. Oregon defeated UCLA for the tournament championship.

Seeds
Teams were seeded by conference record, with ties broken by record between the tied teams followed by record against the regular-season champion, if necessary.

Schedule
The top four seeds received a first-round bye.

Bracket

Game summaries

Tournament notes
 For the first time, the tournament was held in a city and state outside of the conference school locations. Previous title games were held in Arizona or California.
 Stanford set a Pac-12 Tournament record for fewest free-throws attempted (1) and tied the record for fewest makes (1) in an 89-88 overtime loss to Arizona State.
 Utah had only 15 pts. in the 1st half vs. Oregon (with 29), setting a tournament record for fewest points in a half. 
 Josh Huestis of Stanford had 6 blocked shots in a game vs. Arizona State. This set a tournament record which stands today. 
 Five teams were invited to the 2013 NCAA men's basketball tournament: Oregon, UCLA, Arizona, Colorado, and California.

All-Tournament Team
Jahii Carson (Arizona State)
Jordan Adams (UCLA)
Larry Drew II (UCLA)
Arsalan Kazemi (Oregon)
Damyean Dotson (Oregon)
Johnathan Loyd (Oregon)

Most Outstanding Player
Johnathan Loyd (Oregon)

Hall of Honor inductees

Induction for the Hall of Honor on March 16, 2013 were: Jason Gardner (Arizona), Dennis Hamilton (Arizona State), Shareef Abdur-Rahim (California), Cliff Meely (Colorado), Chuck Rask (Oregon), Charlie Sitton (Oregon State), Ron Tomsic (Stanford), Lucius Allen (UCLA), Forrest Twogood (USC), Keith Van Horn (Utah), Nate Robinson (Washington) and Jim Keen (Washington State).

See also
2013 NCAA Men's Division I Basketball Tournament

References

External links

Pac-12 Conference men's basketball tournament
 
Pac-12 Conference men's basketball tournament, 2013